is a Japanese professional footballer who plays as a forward for Rahmatganj MFS in the Bangladesh Football Premier League.

Career
He had joined Persiba Bantul on 6 June 2014.

On 24 December 2014, he signed for Zwekapin United together with Durica Zuparic, Tihomir Zivkovic and Dragan Cicovic.

Club career statistics
As of January 31, 2019

References

External links
 
 Player profil at ligaindonesia.co.id

1985 births
Living people
Japanese footballers
Japanese expatriate footballers
Expatriate footballers in Indonesia
Japanese expatriate sportspeople in Indonesia
Expatriate footballers in Myanmar
Japanese expatriate sportspeople in Myanmar
Expatriate footballers in India
Japanese expatriate sportspeople in India
Royal Wahingdoh FC players
Persiba Bantul players
Zwegabin United F.C. players
Aizawl FC players
Liga 1 (Indonesia) players
I-League players
Place of birth missing (living people)
Association football midfielders